Brian Griffith may refer to:

 Brian Sean Griffith, who conspired with Tonya Harding's husband to assault her opponent
Brian Griffith, musician in Dylan Trees
Brian Griffith, musician in Dead Hot Workshop

See also
Brian Griffiths (disambiguation)